Mary Heisig (1913-1966) was an American artist. Her work is included in the collections of the Whitney Museum of American Art and the Brooklyn Museum.

References

1913 births
1966 deaths
20th-century American women artists
20th-century American artists